Germán Camacho Pacheco (born November 7, 1995) is a Mexican footballer who plays as a defender for Mexican club Tlaxcala.

References

External links
 

Living people
1995 births
Footballers from Morelos
Association football defenders
C.F. Monterrey players
CD Toledo players
Tlaxcala F.C. players
Tercera División de México players
Liga Premier de México players
Liga MX players
Tercera División players
Mexican expatriate footballers
Expatriate footballers in Spain
Mexican expatriate sportspeople in Spain
Mexican footballers